The twelfth season of the Syfy reality television series Face Off (Styled as Face Off: Divide & Conquer) premiered on June 13, 2017. This season divides contestants into two competing FX shops. Each week the teams designate one competitor the foreperson, who designates group tasks, coordinates the project, and represents the team to the judges. At the end of each challenge, the most successful artist from the winning team is declared the challenge winner, and the least successful artist from the losing team is eliminated.

Contestants
Source:

Contestant progress

 The contestant was a member of Twisted Six Effects Shop.
 The contestant was a member of Ethereal Effects Shop.
 The contestant competed individually.

 The contestant won Face Off.
  The contestant was a runner-up.
 The contestant won a Spotlight Challenge.
 The contestant was part of a team that won a Spotlight Challenge.
 The contestant was in the top in the Spotlight Challenge.
 The contestant was declared one of the best in the Spotlight Challenge but was not in the running for the win.
 The contestant was in the bottom in the Spotlight Challenge.
 The contestant was a teammate of the eliminated contestant in the Spotlight Challenge.
 The contestant was eliminated.
‡ The contestant was the Foreperson for their shop this challenge.

Recurring people
 McKenzie Westmore - Host
 Michael Westmore - Mentor

Judges
 Ve Neill
 Glenn Hetrick
 Neville Page

Episodes

References

External links
 Face Off at Syfy.com

Face Off (TV series)
2017 American television seasons